The 1953 College Football All-America team is composed of college football players who were selected as All-Americans by various organizations and writers that chose College Football All-America Teams in 1953. The eight selectors recognized by the NCAA as "official" for the 1953 season are (1) the Associated Press, (2) the United Press, (3) the All-America Board, (4) the American Football Coaches Association (AFCA), (5) the Football Writers Association of America (FWAA), (6) the International News Service (INS), (7) the Newspaper Enterprise Association (NEA), and (8) the Sporting News.

Consensus All-Americans
For the year 1953, the NCAA recognizes eight published All-American teams as "official" designations for purposes of its consensus determinations. The following chart identifies the NCAA-recognized consensus All-Americans and displays which first-team designations they received.

All-American selections for 1953

Ends
Don Dohoney, Michigan State 
Carlton Massey, Texas 
Steve Meilinger, Kentucky 
Sam Morley, Stanford 
John Carson, Georgia 
Ken Buck, Pacific 
Joe Collier, Northwestern 
Don Penza, Notre Dame 
Dick Dietrich, Pittsburgh 
Clyde Bennett, South Carolina 
Gary Knafele, Colorado

Tackles
Stan Jones, Maryland (College and Pro Football Hall of Fame) 
Art Hunter, Notre Dame 
 Jack Shanafelt, Pennsylvania 
Ed Meadows, Duke 
Jim Ray Smith, Baylor 
 John Hudson, Rice 
Sid Fournet, LSU 
Bob Farris, Army 
George Jacoby, Ohio State 
Eldred Kraemer, Pittsburgh

Guards
 J. D. Roberts, Oklahoma (Outland Trophy and College Football Hall of Fame) 
 Crawford Mims, Mississippi 
 Bob Fleck, Syracuse 
 Milt Bohart, Washington 
 Ray Correll, Kentucky 
 Steve Eisenhauer, Navy 
 Gene Lamone, West Virginia 
 Morgan Williams, Texas Christian 
 Bob Burrows, Duke 
 John Bauer, Illinois 
 George Timberlake, Southern California 
 Norm Manoogian, Stanford 
 Joe D'Agostino, Florida

Centers
Larry Morris, Georgia Tech (College Football Hall of Fame) 
Matt Hazeltine, California 
Jerry Hilgenberg, Iowa 
Bob Orders, West Virginia 
Steve Korchek, George Washington

Quarterbacks
Paul Giel, Minnesota (College Football Hall of Fame) 
Bernie Faloney, Maryland 
Jackie Parker, Mississippi State 
Bobby Garrett, Stanford 
Zeke Bratkowski, Georgia 
George Shaw, Oregon

Halfbacks
Johnny Lattner, Notre Dame (Heisman Trophy winner and College Football Hall of Fame) 
Paul Cameron, UCLA 
J. C. Caroline, Illinois (College Football Hall of Fame) 
Leroy Bolden, Michigan State 
Bobby Cavazos, Texas Tech 
Dick Clasby, Harvard 
Larry Grigg, Oklahoma 
Neil Worden, Notre Dame 
Leon Hardeman, Georgia Tech

Fullbacks
 Kosse Johnson, Rice 
 Alan Ameche, Wisconsin 
 Tommy Allman, West Virginia

Key
 Bold – Consensus All-American
 -1 – First-team selection
 -2 – Second-team selection
 -3 – Third-team selection

Official selectors
 AAB = All-America Board
 AFCA = American Football Coaches Association, for Collier's Weekly magazine
 AP = Associated Press
 FWAA = Football Writers Association of America
 INS = International News Service
 NEA = Newspaper Enterprise Association
 SN = The Sporting News: selected "by 150 sportswriters and broadcasters"
 UP = United Press: "selected by 265 sports writers and broadcasters in a nationwide ballot"

Other selectors
 WC = Walter Camp Football Foundation

See also
 1953 All-Atlantic Coast Conference football team
 1953 All-Big Seven Conference football team
 1953 All-Big Ten Conference football team
 1953 All-Pacific Coast Conference football team
 1953 All-SEC football team
 1953 All-Southwest Conference football team

References

All-America Team
College Football All-America Teams